Genta Masuno (Japanese: 増野 元太; born 24 May 1993 in Hakodate) is a Japanese athlete specialising in the 110 metres hurdles. He won the bronze medal at the 2015 Summer Universiade. In addition, he finished fourth at the 2014 Asian Games.

His personal best in the event is 13.58 seconds (+0.4 m/s) set in Fukushima in 2014.

Competition record

References

External links 
 

1993 births
Living people
People from Hakodate
Sportspeople from Hokkaido
Japanese male hurdlers
Asian Games competitors for Japan
Athletes (track and field) at the 2014 Asian Games
Universiade bronze medalists for Japan
Universiade medalists in athletics (track and field)
Medalists at the 2015 Summer Universiade
World Athletics Championships athletes for Japan
Japan Championships in Athletics winners
21st-century Japanese people